Maria Lynn Ehren (born 18 January 1992), known professionally as Maria Poonlertlarp, is a Swedish-Thai model, actress, singer and beauty pageant titleholder, who was crowned Miss Universe Thailand 2017. She represented Thailand at the Miss Universe 2017 competition, finishing as a top five finalist.

Early life
Ehren was born in Bangkok to a Swedish father, Göran Ehren, who is a project development executive and a Thai Chinese mother, Chanoksuang Poonlertlarp, who is a former teacher at the American TESOL Institute.

At the age of two, Ehren and her family moved to Hanoi, Vietnam and at seven, she returned to Bangkok. When she was 14, Ehren began to train as a model with Elle Thailand. After she graduated with a Bachelor of Science degree in international business administration from the Rotterdam School of Management, Erasmus University in 2013, she later attended Stockholm Business School of the Stockholm University, where she received a Master's degree in Consumer and Business Marketing in 2016. Ehren speaks Chinese, English, Swedish, Thai and Vietnamese.

Career 
While residing in Sweden, Ehren was an English teacher and a DJ. She became the head of a marketing committee in the Erasmus Student Network in Rotterdam. In 2014, Ehren returned to Thailand to work for Broadgate Financial, where she advanced to managerial duties in digital marketing.

In August 2016, Ehren started her career in modeling and posed on Beauty cover for Vogue Thailand. In 2018, she became the guest star in the 4th episode of Asia's Next Top Model (season 6). In February 2019, she became a mentor of The Face Thailand (season 5) with Toni Rakkaen, Virahya Pattarachokchai and Bank Anusith.

Pageantry

Miss Universe Thailand 2017
Ehren entered the pageant as a favorite for her existing fame as a model, stage presence and Q&A skills. During its preliminary segment, Ehren won the Boutique Lady title sponsored by Bangkok Airways with a grand prize of 100,000 baht cash prize and a complimentary round-trip first class airline ticket for the upcoming Miss Universe 2017 pageant destination. Ehren was crowned Miss Universe Thailand 2017 on 29 July 2017 at Siam Paragon in Bangkok by outgoing title-holder, Chalita Suansane.

During her national competition, she answered the following:  In the pageant, Ehren won the Thailand sash and crown, a 2018 Honda Civic Turbo RS automobile, one million baht cash prize, and a full-year contract sponsorship by BSC Cosmetology services.

And during her national competition, she indicated she wants to work on issues with sexual equality, teenage pregnancy, proper trash disposal and care for the homeless.

Miss Universe 2017
On 26 November 2017, Ehren represented Thailand at the Miss Universe 2017 pageant in Las Vegas, U.S., where she finished in the top 5.

At the competition, Ehren wore a Thai national costume called Mekhala Lor Kaew, also known as "Chasing the Light" (Mekhala's Jewel Bait), which was inspired by the Thai national epic Ramakien. It was designed by professional artist and designer Prapakas Angsusingha. Ehren had to study and practice khon which includes traditional Thai dance and puppetry art of Hun krabok.

Personal life
Ehren is Buddhist. In addition, she is a volunteer who teaches English at Duang Prateep, a non-profit foundation sponsored by the Thai royal family for children in Thailand.

In 2020, she expressed her support for the protesters of 2020 Thai protests.

Filmography

Television series

Music
Album: Maxi Singles
Style: Pop Dance
Label: SmallRoom
Year: 2010

Single
 Blur (เบลอ) 
 Boong (บุ๋ง)
 Come Along (คัม อะลอง)   
 Grin (รอยยิ้ม)
 Wait up (เก็บโต๊ะ)

References

External links

Ehren's playlist on YouTube

1992 births
Maria Poonlertlarp
Maria Poonlertlarp
Erasmus University Rotterdam alumni
Maria Poonlertlarp
Living people
Miss Universe 2017 contestants
Maria Poonlertlarp
Stockholm University alumni
Maria Poonlertlarp
Maria Poonlertlarp
Maria Poonlertlarp
Maria Poonlertlarp
Maria Poonlertlarp
Maria Poonlertlarp